The Society of Composers, Authors and Music Publishers of Canada (SOCAN) is a Canadian performance rights organization that represents the performing rights of more than 135,000 songwriters, composers and music publishers. The organization collects license fees through a music licensing program approved by the Copyright Board of Canada.

History
SOCAN is a result of a merger that took place in 1990 between the Composers, Authors and Publishers Association of Canada (CAPAC) and the Performing Rights Organization of Canada (PROCAN).

In 2013, Front Row Insurance Brokers Inc. initiated an online musical instrument insurance program for members of various Canadian music associations, including SOCAN.

In May 2016, SOCAN acquired the Seattle-based company Medianet Digital for an undisclosed amount; the organization planned to leverage the company's software and database of rights metadata to assist in the calculation and distribution of royalties for works on digital music streaming services. In July 2016, SOCAN acquired Audiam, a U.S. startup created by TuneCore founder Jeff Price that specializes in managing the distribution of royalties for songs used on digital services such as YouTube, using a database of song recordings and metadata for identification.

In July 2019, SOCAN partnered with Re:Sound to launch Entandem, a single online portal to collect both copyright and neighbouring rights royalties.

See also 
 Entertainment Software Assn v Society of Composers, Authors and Music Publishers of Canada
 Society of Composers, Authors and Music Publishers of Canada v Bell Canada
 Society of Composers, Authors and Music Publishers of Canada v Canadian Assn of Internet Providers

References

External links

Canadian copyright law
Music licensing organizations
Music organizations based in Canada
1989 establishments in Canada
Organizations established in 1989